Josia integra is a moth of the  family Notodontidae. It is found from southern Mexico to Belize.

External links
Species page at Tree of Life project

Notodontidae
Moths described in 1854